Vanino railway station is a railway station in Vanino, Russia.

It includes the building of the railway station and the passenger platform. Tickets of Vanino-Kholmsk train ferry are sold in the station building.

References

Railway stations in Khabarovsk Krai